The Fair Tax Mark is an independent accreditation awarded by the Fair Tax Foundation after an assessment based on "Transparency [and] tax rate, disclosure and avoidance"... As of January 2016, it is applicable to UK businesses. The process of assessing a company for the mark is intended to be initiated by the company that wants the mark.

The mark is awarded by the company Fair Tax Foundation Limited, a not-for-profit community benefit society, incorporated 18 February 2014, company number IP032308. The Tax Justice Network assisted in raising initial funding, and it is supported by a number of other organisations including the Public and Commercial Services Union. Before the present company was formed, an "earlier incarnation" undertook a pilot study in June 2013.

Tax policy 

In their directors' report in their financial statements for the period ending 31 December 2014, Fair Tax Mark Limited committed themselves to paying taxes "in accordance with the spirit of all tax laws" and not to use options, allowances, or reliefs, or undertake specific transactions "that are contrary to the spirit of the law".

Awardees
The first organisations to be accredited, in February 2014, were Midcounties Co-operative, The Phone Co-op and Unity Trust Bank. 

As of May 2021, 62 companies had been awarded the mark, including SSE plc, the first FTSE100 company to achieve the mark.

References

Tax
Standards of the United Kingdom
Ethical principles